Ylvis are a Norwegian comedy duo consisting of brothers Vegard and Bård Ylvisåker. They debuted as professional variety artists in 2000 and have since appeared in several countries in variety shows, comedy concerts, television shows, radio shows and music videos. They hosted the Norwegian talk show  (Tonight with Ylvis) (2011–2016). Their song and music video "The Fox (What Does the Fox Say?)", written and filmed for the talk show, went viral on YouTube in September 2013. The video has over 1.1 billion views . They released an album called Ylvis: Volume I, a compilation of ten older singles. In 2018, the brothers released a series titled Stories from Norway, in which they collected headlining stories from Norway and presented them as short musical documentaries to address satire, fun and comedy.

Early life and debut 
Vegard Urheim (born 19 May 1979 in Trondheim) and Bård Urheim Ylvisåker (born 21 March 1982 in Bergen) were born to parents (Hans Terje Ylvisåker and Helga Urheim) from the Sogn district of Western Norway, the older two of three brothers. The youngest brother is Bjarte Urheim. Their early childhood years were spent in Angola and Mozambique, where their father was an engineer during the civil wars there. After a few years in Africa, the family moved back to Bergen, where the brothers received a musical upbringing and were trained in classical instruments. Vegard played the viola and Bård the violin. However, both quit during their youth, Vegard instead focusing on guitar, voice, piano, double bass and comedy, and Bård on guitar, voice, comedy and acrobatics such as aerial silk.

While attending high school at Fana gymnas, they were heavily involved in school and variety shows as well as the school choir. During a performance, they were spotted by impresario Peter Brandt, who orchestrated their debut as professional variety artists at Ole Bull Teater in Bergen in 2000. Their debut show was called "" ("Ylvis: A Cabaret") and was followed in 2003 by "" ("Ylvis: A Concert").

2006–2009 
In 2006, the brothers debuted as hosts on national broadcasting with the radio show O-fag (theoretical subject, named after a subject previously taught in Norwegian primary schools, a combination of science and social studies) on NRK Radio.

In January 2007, they appeared onstage at Ole Bull Theater with a new variety show, Ylvis III. They toured with the show for almost three years, the last show being played in Odda in western Norway in December 2009. The show was also recorded and published on DVD. Also in 2007, they debuted as hosts on national television with the show  (Norway's Most Wonderful), a version of the Swedish show  (100 Highs). This was released on DVD as well as broadcast on Swedish TV.

In 2008 they released a second series of the radio show O-fag and also a new TV show based on their  stage show on TVNorge, a game show concept inspired by the "Brain Wall", a feature in the Japanese game show  on Fuji TV.

This was followed up by another game show,  (Who can beat Ylvis?) in 2009, based on the German show  (Beat Raab). Members of the public were invited to try to beat the brothers at various tasks, with a reward of up to one million Norwegian kroner.

2009–present 
In 2010, they hosted  (The Nordic’s Most Wonderful), a pan-Nordic version of the show. In 2011 they reprised their variety stage show with "Ylvis 4", premiering at the Ole Bull Theater with the entire run sold out before opening night. That year, the brothers also launched a comedy talkshow  (Tonight with Ylvis) on TVNorge, with Calle Hellevang-Larsen from comedy trio  as a sidekick.

Upon being renewed for a second season, the brothers created a production company, Concorde TV, in order to retain rights and creative control of their work. The second series was broadcast in 2012, with David Batra replacing Hellevang-Larsen in the role of sidekick. Despite technical difficulties during the broadcast, the first episode took the top ratings spot.

"The Fox" and "Stonehenge" have also been released as singles.

Ylvis received offers for interviews, concerts, and major label record contracts from several countries following the release of "The Fox". Their first performance abroad was on The Ellen DeGeneres Show in the United States, where they appeared on 20 September 2013. They also made an appearance at the iHeartRadio Music Festival in Las Vegas the next day. On 9 October 2013, Jimmy Fallon brought them to his late night show to perform live. On 11 October 2013, they performed on The Today Show outside the studios. On 15 November 2013 they performed on BBC Children in Need where they were joined on stage by Jedward, The Cheeky Girls and Bucks Fizz. On 22 November 2013 Ylvis attended Mnet Asian Music Awards for the first time, and received the International Favorite Artist award.

On 12 December 2013, they appeared on Live! with Kelly and Michael to promote their new children's book titled "What Does the Fox Say?" and later to perform. The book What Does the Fox Say? debuted as no. 1 on The New York Times Best Seller list.

On 15 October 2014 Ylvis released on iTunes a single titled "I Will Never Be A Star", which was recorded by their younger brother, Bjarte Ylvisåker. On 19 November 2015 Ylvis released their first album Ylvis: Volume I on iTunes, which is a collection of some of their popular YouTube hits. On 5 January 2016, Ylvis revealed the music video and song "a capella" on I kveld med YLVIS on TVNorge. "a capella" parodies a cappella groups like Pentatonix.

In 2015, Ylvis received a nomination at the Berlin Music Video Awards for Best Animation with their music video ''Ytterst på tissen” (On the Tip of the Willy)''. The video was made by Julian Nazario Vargas from Animaskin.

On 1 November 2017, it was revealed that the brothers would start a new television show entitled Stories from Norway. The show, which blends the documentary and mockumentary genres with musical numbers, premiered on 19 February 2018 on TVNorge.

In 2019, both brothers appeared on the first season of Kongen Befaler (Norway's version of Taskmaster), and the series overall winner was Vegard.

In January 2022, after the participants for Melodi Grand Prix 2022 were revealed, Ylvis have been one of the duos rumoured to be behind Subwoolfer, who won the contest and represented Norway in the Eurovision Song Contest 2022. 

On 6 October 2022 the brothers announced a new show entitled Ylvis i Sogn. In the 10 episode series Bård has challenged himself, Vegard, and younger brother Bjarte to write 8 songs in 2 weeks, with the 8th song being a modern remake of Stao no Pao.

Filmography

Stage

Discography

Studio albums

Singles

DVD releases 
 Ylvis III

Awards

References

External links 
 
 

Musical groups established in 2000
Musical groups from Bergen
Norwegian male comedians
Sibling musical duos
Parlophone artists
English-language singers from Norway
Comedy musical groups
Norwegian musical duos
Norwegian television presenters